Sahat kula or Saat kula (meaning "clock tower") can refer to:
Clock Tower of Podgorica
Clock Tower of Bitola
Clock Tower of Ulcinj